August 5 - Eastern Orthodox liturgical calendar - August 7

All fixed commemorations below are observed on August 19 by Eastern Orthodox Churches on the Old Calendar.

For August 6, Orthodox Churches on the Old Calendar commemorate the Saints listed on July 24.

Feasts

 The Holy Transfiguration of Our Lord, God, and Savior Jesus Christ (Second "Feast of the Savior" in August)

Pre-Schism Western saints

 Saints Justus and Pastor, two brothers, aged respectively thirteen and nine, scourged and beheaded at Alcalá in Spain under Diocletian (c. 304)
 Saint Hormisdas, Pope of Rome and Confessor, author of the Formula of Hormisdas (523)
 Saint Hardulf, a hermit at Breedon in Leicestershire in England where the church is dedicated to him (7th century)
 Saint Gezelin (Ghislain, Gisle, Joscelin), a hermit honoured in Slebusrode (Schlebuschrath) near Cologne in Germany.
 Saint Stephen of Cardeña and Companions, Abbot of the Castilian monastery of Cardeña near Burgos in Spain, where there were over two hundred monks, martyred by the Saracens (872)

Post-Schism Orthodox saints

 Saint Theoctistus, Bishop of Chernigov (1123)  (see also: August 5)
 New Martyr Abbacum of Thessalonica (1628)

New martyrs and confessors

 New Hieromartyr Maxim Sandovich of Lemkovyna, priest, protomartyr of the Lemko people, by the Austro-Hungarians (1914)  (see also July 24 - Old Calendar; and September 6/August 24)
 New Hieromartyr Nicholas Prozorov, Priest (1930)
 New Hieromartyr Nikolai Zavarin, Priest (1937)
 New Hieromartyr Peter Tokarev, Priest, of Yaroslavl-Rostov (1937)
 New Hieromartyr Dimitry (Lyubimov), Archbishop of Gdov (1938)

Other commemorations

 Repose of Hieroschemamonk Nikon the Cave-dweller, of Valaam Monastery (1822)
 Repose of Priest Basil Shoustin, disciple of Optina Elders (1968)
 Repose of Elder Tryphon of Kapsala, Mount Athos (1978)

Icon gallery

Notes

References

Sources
 August 6 / August 19. Orthodox Calendar (PRAVOSLAVIE.RU).
 August 19 / August 6. Holy Trinity Russian Orthodox Church (A parish of the Patriarchate of Moscow).
 August 6. OCA - The Lives of the Saints.
 The Autonomous Orthodox Metropolia of Western Europe and the Americas (ROCOR). St. Hilarion Calendar of Saints for the year of our Lord 2004. St. Hilarion Press (Austin, TX). p. 58.
 Menologion: The Sixth Day of the Month of August. Orthodoxy in China.
 August 6. Latin Saints of the Orthodox Patriarchate of Rome.
 The Roman Martyrology. Transl. by the Archbishop of Baltimore. Last Edition, According to the Copy Printed at Rome in 1914. Revised Edition, with the Imprimatur of His Eminence Cardinal Gibbons. Baltimore: John Murphy Company, 1916. p. 234.
 Rev. Richard Stanton. A Menology of England and Wales, or, Brief Memorials of the Ancient British and English Saints Arranged According to the Calendar, Together with the Martyrs of the 16th and 17th Centuries. London: Burns & Oates, 1892. p. 382.

 Greek Sources
 Great Synaxaristes:  6 ΑΥΓΟΥΣΤΟΥ. ΜΕΓΑΣ ΣΥΝΑΞΑΡΙΣΤΗΣ.
  Συναξαριστής. 6 Αυγούστου. ECCLESIA.GR. (H ΕΚΚΛΗΣΙΑ ΤΗΣ ΕΛΛΑΔΟΣ).

 Russian Sources
  19 августа (6 августа). Православная Энциклопедия под редакцией Патриарха Московского и всея Руси Кирилла (электронная версия). (Orthodox Encyclopedia - Pravenc.ru).

August in the Eastern Orthodox calendar